Milan Đukić (born 16 August 1985) is a Serbian handball player for Macedonian club Eurofarm Pelister and the Serbia national team.

Club career
After playing for his hometown club Radnički Kragujevac, Đukić moved across the border to Borac Banja Luka in July 2011. He later played for Meshkov Brest from 2012 to 2014, before rejoining Borac Banja Luka. In February 2016, Đukić returned to his parent club Radnički Kragujevac.

International career
At international level, Đukić represented Serbia at the 2020 European Championship.

Honours
Meshkov Brest
 Belarusian Men's Handball Championship: 2013–14
 Belarusian Men's Handball Cup: 2013–14
Borac Banja Luka
 Handball Championship of Bosnia and Herzegovina: 2014–15
 Handball Cup of Bosnia and Herzegovina: 2014–15
Vojvodina
 Serbian Handball Super League: 2016–17
 Serbian Handball Super Cup: 2016

References

External links
 

1985 births
Living people
Sportspeople from Kragujevac
Serbian male handball players
RK Borac Banja Luka players
RK Vojvodina players
Expatriate handball players
Serbian expatriate sportspeople in Bosnia and Herzegovina
Serbian expatriate sportspeople in Belarus
Serbian expatriate sportspeople in North Macedonia